Malden Public Schools is a school district headquartered in Malden, Massachusetts in Greater Boston.

Dana Brown, the principal of Malden High School, stated that one reason why the schools of Malden Public Schools often have test scores higher than those of other urban schools is because immigrant parents and their children, as paraphrased by Maria Sacchetti of the Boston Globe, "appear to be eager to seize the opportunities they are given".

As of 2009, almost 40% of students speak a language other than English in their residences, and 64% of students in the district are racial and ethnic minorities. In 1993, 28% of students were racial and ethnic minorities.

Schools
 Malden High School
 K-8 schools:
 Beebe School
 Ferryway School
 Forestdale School
 Linden STEAM Academy
 Salemwood School
 PreK: Early Learning Center

References

External links
 Malden Public Schools
 Schools - City of Malden

School districts in Massachusetts